Bryoporus is a genus of beetles belonging to the family Staphylinidae.

The genus was first described by Kraatz in 1957.

The genus has almost cosmopolitan distribution.

Species:
 Bryoporus cernuus (Gravenhorst, 1806)

References

Tachyporinae
Staphylinidae genera